The BMW International Open is an annual men's professional golf tournament on the European Tour held in Germany.

History
Founded in 1989, it was held near BMW's home city of Munich every year until 2012. From 1989 to 1993 and from 1997 to 2011 it was played at the Golfclub München Eichenried while from 1994 to 1996 it was held at St. Eurach Land-und-Golfclub. In 2012, 2014, 2016 and 2018, the event was played at Golf Club Gut Lärchenhof near Cologne, alternating with Golfclub München Eichenried, which hosted the event in 2011, 2013, 2015, 2017 and 2019.

The event was for a time the only European Tour event played in Germany, until the Porsche European Open moved to Germany in 2015.

Winners

Notes

References

External links
Coverage on the European Tour's official site

Golf tournaments in Germany
European Tour events
Recurring sporting events established in 1989
1989 establishments in West Germany